Tunku Abdul Majid Idris Ismail Ibrahim ibni Almarhum Sultan Iskandar (born 20 July 1970, in Johor Bahru) is a member of the hereditary nobility in Malaysia as the prince (Tunku Aris Bendahara) of Johor. Tunku Majid has served in honorary positions in national sports associations including as President of the Malaysian Golf Association and as Deputy President of the Malaysian Hockey Confederation. An incident in 1992 in which Tunku Majid was alleged to have assaulted a hockey coach led to the ending of legal immunity for Malaysia's nobility.

He is the half-brother of the Sultan of Johor, Sultan Ibrahim Ismail.

Biography
Tunku Majid is the second son of Sultan Iskandar by his second wife Sultanah Zanariah, and was born on 20 July 1970 at the Sultanah Aminah Hospital in Johor Bahru.
In his youth, he began his early education at Temenggong Abdul Rahman Primary School and then continued his secondary education at English College Johore Bahru. Subsequently, he pursued his higher education in Business Management at MENLO College, Palo Alto in San Francisco, United States. Tunku Majid also took part in international sports tournaments in the 1980s as a youth, particularly windsurfing, hockey and golf. In 1989, after his uncle, Tunku Abdul Rahman passed, the incumbent Tunku Bendahara of Johor, Tunku Majid was appointed by his father to succeed Tunku Abdul Rahman on 23 September 1992.

On 13 January 2006, Tunku Majid married Tunku Teh Mazni Binti Tunku Yusuf, a member of Kedah and Kelantan royal family. Tunku Teh's father is the son of Tunku Temenggong of Kedah, Tunku Muhammad Jiwa Ibni Sultan Abdul Hamid and her mother Tengku Embong Suria, is the daughter of Tengku Sri Pekerma D’Raja of Kelantan, Tengku Abdul Majid Ibni Tengku Besar Tuan Yusof. They have two sons, Tunku Mahmood Iskandar, whom Tunku Majid named after his father, Sultan Mahmood Iskandar and second son, Tunku Abdul Mateen Idris Ismail Ibrahim Iskandar, and a daughter named Tunku Aisha Menjalara Iskandar.

Children and their date of birth
 Yang Mulia Tunku Mahmood Iskandar (born on ) (Age ) at Johor Bahru, Johor)
 Yang Mulia Tunku Aisha Menjalara Iskandar (born on ) (Age ) at Johor Bahru, Johor)
 Yang Mulia Tunku Abdul Mateen Idris Ismail Ibrahim Iskandar (born on ) (Age ) at Johor Bahru, Johor)

Societal contributions
Tunku Majid held the honorary positions of President of the Malaysian Golf Association and Deputy President of the Malaysian Hockey Confederation. In 2008, he proposed the formation of the ASEAN Golf Foundation. Presidents of the golf clubs of the ASEAN countries will take turns to serve as its secretary general. In addition, he was also noted for his contributions to the development of the Malaysian hockey and golf teams. In late 2008, an internal crisis in the administration of these sports associations resulted in Tunku Majid being relieved of his positions.

Controversies

Gomez Incident

In 1992 Tunku Majid was alleged to have assaulted a hockey coach, which culminated in the Malaysia nobility losing immunity from legal prosecution. On 10 July 1992, Tunku Majid was alleged to have assaulted Jaafar Vello (also known as Jaafar Selvaraj), the coach of Perak hockey club, after Perak won the match against Tunku Majid's team. Jaafar lodged a police report. Following press reports on the incident, and the Malaysian Hockey Federation banned Tunku Majid from participating in national hockey tournaments for five years.

Sultan Iskandar, apparently infuriated by the decision, issued an edict to pressure the Johor education department to enforce a boycott of Johor hockey teams participation in national hockey tournaments. Hockey coaches criticised his decision. Sultan Iskandar, taking Gomez' remarks in offence, ordered Gomez to meet him in November 1992 at Istana Bukit Serene, where he reprimanded and assaulted Gomez. The incident sparked off a standoff between the Malaysian government and members of the royalty after the government proposed changes to review the status of the legal immunity of the rulers.

Tunku Majid went on trial for voluntarily causing hurt, and pleaded not guilty. Court sessions into January 1993 convicted him of deliberately causing hurt and hence made him liable to a jail term and/or a fine, though neither penalties were applied following an official pardon issued by his father.

MGA crisis
In November 2008, accusations by the Malaysian Golf Association was brought by its members against Tunku Majid for excessive and unethical use of the association's funds. A committee member, Abdul Majid Md Yusoff–an elected committee member who issued the notice of the EGM, in which Tunku Majid responded strongly to his claims. Shortly before an Extraordinary General Meeting was held to decide the fate of Tunku Majid, Tunku Majid said that it was unconstitutional to the vires of the rules of the MGA and pledged to continue serving the association until his term expires the following year, but also expressing that he would not seek re-election to be its association's president. He expressed his decision to boycott the meeting, after seeking legal advice from a lawyer.

The delegates voted in favour of impeaching Tunku Majid as his president. A vote of no confidence against Tunku Majid as President was taken–with 129 delegates voting in favour of his impeachment and 33 against. However, questions were about the technical ambiguity questioned the legitimacy of the meeting, whose views were also supported by former President Thomas Lee and vice-President Zain Yusof. Following the delegation, Tunku Majid expressed that he still believed that he was the President of the MGA. Members of the MGA rebutted by citing provisions within its constitution, and refuted Tunku Majid's claims that the EGM was unconstitutional.

In a surprise move, delegates swiftly elected MGA's vice President Robin Loh in Tunku Majid's place, arguing that its legitimacy as provided by the association's constitution.

Honours of Tunku Abdul Majid 

He was awarded :

Johor Honours 
  First Class of the Royal Family Order of Johor (DK I) (8 April 1996)
  Knight Grand Commander of the Order of the Crown of Johor (SPMJ) – Dato'.
  Sultan Ibrahim Coronation Medal (PSI) (1st class) (23 March 2015).

Honours of Tunku Teh Mazni 

She was awarded :

Johor Honours 
  Knight Grand Commander of the Order of the Crown of Johor (SPMJ) (11 April 2009) – Datin Paduka.

Ancestry

Notes

References

 Indonesia, Malaysia & Singapore Handbook, 1995, Betty Waterton, Joshua Eliot, Passport Books, Jane Bickersteth, Jonathan Miller, Georgina Matthews, Sebastian Ballard, published by McGraw-Hill Trade, 1995, 
 Islam Embedded: The Historical Development of the Pan-Malaysian Islamic Party PAS, 1951–2003, Farish Ahmad Noor, published by Malaysian Sociological Research Institute, 2004
 Johore and the Origins of British Control, 1895-1914, Nesalamar Nadarajah, published by Arenabuku, 2000, 
 Mahathir di Sebalik Tabir, Zainuddin Maidin, published by Utusan Publications, 1994
 Mahathir Mohamad, Prime Minister of Malaysia, by M. Rajendran, published by IBS Buku, 2003, 
 Monarchy in South-East Asia: The Faces of Tradition in Transition, Roger Kershaw, published by Routledge, 2001, 
 Siapa Kebal, Mahathir atau Raja-Raja Melayu?, Yahaya Ismail, published by Dinamika Kreatif, 1993
 Tengku Ahmad Rithauddeen His Story, K.N. Nadarajah, published by Pelanduk Publications, 2000, 
 The Other Side of Mahathir, Zainudin Maidin, A. Hulaimi, published by Utusan Publications & Distributors, 1994

1970 births
Corporate scandals
House of Temenggong of Johor
Living people
Recipients of Malaysian royal pardons
People convicted of assault
Tunku Abdul Majid
Sons of monarchs